The Turtle Butte Formation is a geologic formation at Turtle Butte in South Dakota. It preserves fossils dating back to the Paleogene period.

See also

 List of fossiliferous stratigraphic units in South Dakota
 Paleontology in South Dakota

References

 

Paleogene geology of South Dakota